Genustes is a genus of moths of the family Palaeosetidae. It consists of only one species, Genustes lutata, which is only known from India.

References

Hepialoidea
Monotypic moth genera
Exoporia genera
Moths of Asia